Frank Stringfellow may refer to:
 Benjamin Franklin Stringfellow (1840–1913), Confederate spy
 Benjamin Franklin Stringfellow (1816–1891), railway tycoon
 Frank Stringfellow (footballer) (1889–1948), English footballer
 Frank Stringfellow (actor), see Yellow Jack